The women's heptathlon event at the 2016 IAAF World U20 Championships was held at Zdzisław Krzyszkowiak Stadium on 21 and 22 July.

Medalists

Records

Results

Final standings

References

Heptathlon
Combined events at the World Athletics U20 Championships